"Just Walk Away" is a song by Canadian singer Celine Dion, recorded for her third English-language album, The Colour of My Love (1993). It was released as a radio single in Spain in 1995. The music was written by Marti Sharron and lyrics by Albert Hammond. The track was produced by Steve Lindsey, with additional production by Humberto Gatica. Lindsey worked before with artists like Elton John, Leonard Cohen, Marvin Gaye, and Peter Gabriel.

Background and release
There was no video made for the song. The song was the background song of the 1999 Japanese television drama "Kōri no Sekai (氷の世界)" or "Ice World".

The song was not featured on the US edition of The Colour of My Love, except on digital or steaming platforms.

Formats and track listings
Spanish promotional CD single
"Just Walk Away" – 4:58

References

1993 songs
1995 singles
1990s ballads
Celine Dion songs
Pop ballads
Songs about heartache
Songs written by Albert Hammond